Termessa is a genus of moths in the subfamily Arctiinae The genus was described by Newman in 1856.

Species
 Termessa catocalina (Walker, [1865])
 Termessa congrua Walker, [1865]
 Termessa conographa Meyrick, 1886
 Termessa diplographa Turner, 1899
 Termessa discrepans Walker, [1865]
 Termessa gratiosa (Walker, [1865])
 Termessa laeta Walker, 1856
 Termessa nivosa Walker, 1865
 Termessa orthocrossa Turner, 1922
 Termessa shepherdi Newman, 1856
 Termessa xanthomelas Lower, 1892
 Termessa zonophanes Meyrick, 1888

References

External links

Lithosiini
Moth genera